Erik von Heland  (1880–1963) was a Swedish politician. He was a member of the Centre Party.

References
This article was initially translated from the Swedish Wikipedia article.

1880 births
1978 deaths
Centre Party (Sweden) politicians
Governors of Blekinge County